Hillaby is a community on the borders of parishes Saint Thomas and Saint Andrew in Barbados. Historically it has always been referred to as Hillaby in St. Thomas  it is the top third of the village which is in St. Andrew, with the greater area in St. Thomas.

References

Populated places in Barbados
Saint Andrew, Barbados